Camon may refer to:

Places
 Camon, Ariège, a commune in the Midi-Pyrénées region of southern France
 Camon, Somme, a commune in the Picardie region of northern France
 Camon (biblical place), a biblical location in Gilead

Other
Camon (surname)
 Camon, a common name for Oenocarpus bacaba, a fruiting palm tree native to South America

See also
Kamon (disambiguation)